The Ghana Navy (GN) is the naval warfare organizational military branch of the Ghanaian Armed Forces (GAF). The Ghanaian Navy, along with the Ghanaian Army (GA) and Ghanaian Air Force (GHF), make up the Ghanaian Armed Forces (GAF) which are controlled by the Ghanaian Ministry of Defence (MoD).

History

The nucleus of the Ghana Navy is the Gold Coast Naval Volunteer Force formed during World War II. It was established by the colonial British administration to conduct seaward patrols to ensure that the coastal waters of the colony were free from mines. Following Ghana's attainment of independent nationhood on 6 March 1957 from the UK, the country's military was reorganized and expanded to meet its new challenges. A new volunteer force was raised in June, 1959 with headquarters at Takoradi in the Western Region of Ghana.  The men were drawn from the existing Gold Coast Regiment of Infantry. They were under the command of British Royal Navy officers on secondment. On 29 July 1959, the Ghana Navy was established by an Act of Parliament. The force had two divisions based at Takoradi and Accra respectively. On 1 May 1962, the British Navy formed the Royal Navy Element of the British Joint Services Training Team, thus changing the nature of its relationship with the Ghana Navy. The first Chief of the Naval Staff was Captain D. A. Foreman, a retired British Naval Officer. He was granted a Presidential Commission as a Ghana naval officer in the rank of commodore. In September 1961 Nkrumah terminated the employment of British officers in the armed forces: the first Ghanaian to become Chief of the Naval Staff was Rear Admiral David Animle Hansen, who was transferred from the Ghana army to head the navy. On September 14 1990, the GNS Achimota was hit by NPFL artillery while on a fact-finding mission near Monrovia. As a result, 2 Ghanaian sailors and 3 Nigerian nurses were killed, and the Ghanaian Air Force retaliated with airstrikes.

Organization

The Ghana Navy command structure consists of the Naval Headquarters at Burma Camp, Accra. There are three operational commands, the Western Naval Command at Sekondi, the Eastern Naval Command at Tema and The Naval Training Command at Nutekpor-Sogakope in the Volta Region.

Western Naval Command

The command comprises the following elements:
HQ Western Naval Command
Ghana Navy Fleet
The Naval Dockyard Complex
Ghana Navy Stores Depot
Naval Base, Sekondi – West Command
The Naval Trade Training School

Eastern Naval Command

The command comprises the following elements:
HQ Eastern Naval Command
Basic and Leadership Training School
Naval Base, Tema
Ghana Navy Band, Tema

Departments
The navy is organized into the following departments.
Operations
Administration
Training
Logistics (Supply)
Technical
Intelligence and
Research and Development

Roles
The Ghana Navy fulfills a broad range of roles. These include:

The monitoring, control and surveillance of fishing activities
Maritime Presence in the West African Waters and Naval Support in the Region and Crises Areas when requested
Surveillance, Effective Patrol and Control of Ghana's Territorial Waters and Economic Zone
Evacuation operations of Ghanaian and other nationals from troubled spots
Fighting and checking criminal activities such as piracy/armed robbery at sea, smuggling of illicit drugs, stowaways and dissident activities
Disaster and humanitarian relief operations, search and rescue, and other mercy missions at sea
Assisting civil authorities such as the Ghana Police, the Volta River Authority, the Electoral Commission, Ghana Ports and Harbours Authority

Equipment

Current active naval vessels

Snake-class patrol vessels

46.8m patrol vessels ordered from China's Poly Technologies subsidiary of China Poly Group Corporation in 2011 and delivered to GN (Ghana Navy) in October 2011. The boats were commissioned 21 February 2012.

Balsam-class patrol ships

U. S. Coast Guard vessels.  After serving the USCG for 57 years, Woodrush was decommissioned on March 2, 2001, and sold to GN (Ghana Navy) to serve as GNS Anzone P30.

Chamsuri-class patrol boat

Republic of Korea Navy vessels. Chamsuri means 'Sea Dolphin'.

Albatros-class fast attack craft

German navy. Purchased in 2005 at $35 million for the two ships.

Warrior-class/Gepard-class fast attack craft

German navy S74 Nerz and  S77 Dachs. Purchased at $37 million for the two ships.

USCG Defender-class boat

U. S. Coast Guard.  In 2008, the Ghana Navy acquired three such boats from the US Navy. They were handed over to the GN Western Naval Command in Sekondi-Takoradi. On 13 March 2010, presented four additional boats.

Others

GNS Achimota (P28) – Flagship of the Ghana Navy.  German built FPB 57-class patrol ship (Launched: 14 March 1979, commissioned: 27 March 1981)
GNS Yogaga (P29) – German-built FPB 57-class patrol ship (1979)
GNS David Hansen – Named after David Animle Hansen, first Ghanaian Chief of Staff of the Ghana Navy.  A single 20 m-long ex-US Navy PB Mk III inshore patrol craft that was built in the 1970s and transferred to Ghana in 2001.
On 10 December 2010, the Ghana Navy received six new speedboats with complete accessories from Ghana Red Cross to facilitate its rescue mission in the country. The accessories included six Yamaha outboard motors, life jackets, life lines, first aid equipment and maintenance tools.

Past naval vessels

The initial fleet of the navy consisted of two Ham-class minesweepers, GNS Yogaga and GNS Afadzato. They were recommissioned on 31 October 1959. They were joined by four T43-class minesweepers from the Soviet Union between 1961 and 1964, three Komar-class missile boats between 1967 and 1970 and one more in 1980, and two Yurka-class minesweepers in 1981–82. In 1965, a frigate was ordered by the government of President Nkrumah, intended to also serve as the presidential yacht. The warship was laid down by Yarrow Shipbuilders in Scotland under the name Black Star, but when Nkrumah was deposed in a coup in the following year, the project was cancelled.

Future plans

The Ghanaian Defence Minister, Lieutenant General J. H. Smith, announced in June 2010 that over 10 ships would be acquired as part of a short-term plan to re-equip the navy, and defend Ghana's exclusive economic zone.

Rank structure

Officers
The GN officers in descending order of seniority:

Ratings
The GN ratings in descending order of seniority:

References

External links
Official page
Ghana Navy uniform insignia

Military of Ghana
Military units and formations established in 1959
Navies by country
1959 establishments in Ghana